The Loudoun County Sheriff's Office (LCSO) is the primary law enforcement agency within Loudoun County, Virginia and is the largest Sheriff's Office in the Commonwealth of Virginia.

Organization
The agency is currently headed by Sheriff Michael L. Chapman who was last re-elected in 2019.

Administration Bureau 
The Administration Bureau oversees two Divisions:

Administrative and Technical Services Division 
This division handles personnel, hiring, administrative, and technological duties for the entire agency.

Corrections and Court Services Division 
This division oversees the Loudoun County Adult Detention Center, which confines prisoners awaiting trial/sentencing, transfer to state prisons, and persons who have been arrested, provides facility security and inmate services, processes inmates, keeps inmate records, and provides security for the Loudoun County Courthouse Complex.

Operations Bureau 
The Operations Bureau oversees the majority of the Sheriff's Office enforcement personnel and sections. Within it are three Divisions:

Field Operations Division 
Deputies responsible for patrolling the county and responding to calls are assigned to this Division. They are assigned to one of four stations within the county. The Canine Unit, Special Operations Section, and other units are located in this Division as well.

Operations Support Division 
This division contains units that are mainly secondary or part-time assignments for patrol deputies. It includes the Traffic Unit, Accident Reconstruction, School Resource Unit, specialized response teams, and other sections.

Criminal Investigations Division 
Detectives are assigned to this division. Within it are the Major Crimes Section, Tactical Enforcement Unit, Crime Scene Investigation, and other sections.

Some specific units and sections include:
Adult Crime Prevention Unit The Adult Crime Prevention Unit offers many programs to assist and train the community in many aspects of crime prevention.
Sheriff's Auxiliary Auxiliary personnel provide services during public service events and assist law enforcement personnel in the performance of their duties.
Juvenile Crime Prevention/D.A.R.E. The Juvenile Crime Prevention/D.A.R.E offers many programs to assist and train children in many aspects of crime prevention.
Sheriff's Emergency Response Team (SERT) The SERT Team activates for hostage and/or barricaded persons, sniper incidents, ambush attacks, and to resolve any special, high risk situation task.
Hostage Negotiations Team The Hostage Negotiation Team is responsible for conducting negotiations with perpetrators of incidents involving hostages, barricaded persons or situations where negotiations could prevent serious injury or the loss of life.
Traffic Safety Unit The Traffic Safety Unit is composed of the Accident Reconstruction Unit, Motorcycle Squad, and the Motor Carrier Safety Inspection Team.
Dive Team The dive team aids in the search and rescue of victims of water-related accidents; and assists in the search and recovery of evidential items from bodies of water.
Bicycle Patrol Team The Bicycle Patrol Team's focus is on building a better relationship with the public by getting out in the neighborhoods and focusing on the community's needs.
Crossing Guard Program
Identification The Identification team focuses on evidence recovery, collection, and preservation, evidence processing, photographic documentation, latent examinations, and fingerprint/photograph file maintenance.
Canine Team The K-9 Unit is assigned to the Special Operations Division and supports of the other divisions of the Sheriffs Office.
Computer Forensics Section The Computer Forensics Team focuses on computer-involved criminal investigations, computer seizures, data recovery/preservation, and documentation of evidential data.
Project Fairness Project Fairness enforces the compliance of displaying a valid decal throughout the county
Crime Scene Technicians
Civil Disturbance Response Team

Rank Structure

Equipment 
All LCSO patrol deputies use Dodge Chargers while supervisors and deputies in special units, such as the Commercial Vehicle Inspection Team, drive Dodge Durangos. The agency also owns a limited number of Chevy Tahoes, used mainly by K9 deputies, as well as assorted other vehicles used by one or more units. The agency formerly used Ford Crown Victorias for patrolling. All vehicles are painted white with a multi-shade brown stripe on the side and a blue lightbar.

Fallen officers
Since the establishment of the Loudoun County Sheriff's Office, 1 deputy has died in the line of duty. Deputy Charles Barton died after sustaining injuries in the crash of Atlantic Southeast Airlines Flight 529 in Atlanta, Georgia, while assigned to an extradition case. The Fraternal Order of Police Lodge 70 in Leesburg was named Stewart-Barton lodge, partly in honor of Barton.

Potential Transition to Police Department
Shortly after being re-elected in 2019, Loudoun County Board of Supervisors Chairwoman Phyllis Randall proposed transitioning policing to a new police department while the sheriff would only be responsible for court related duties as is done in Prince William County and Fairfax County. Randall said the reason she proposed this is "I just simply don’t believe that law enforcement should be political." However, Sheriff Michael L. Chapman has stated that "[Loudoun Residents] are happy with the service they are getting, and it’s almost like, 'Why is there going to be a move to try and fix something that’s not broken?' it just seems to me to be a matter of just exercising power and control."

In 2012, the Board of Supervisors asked for a report about a potential transition and the commission responsible strongly recommended keeping the current system citing decreased state funding due to low crime rates and the idea that a police chief would be equally political when appointed.

To implement a police department a referendum is required and must be approved by voters in the county and enacted by the Virginia General Assembly.

In 2022, the Board of Supervisors announced that it would no longer seek the transition following an extensive report on the subject was released by the International Association of Chiefs of Police. The report recommended that the transition not go forward due to several reasons, including the cost (estimated to be between $200 and $300 million), the LCSO's very high satisfaction rates among county citizens, and the low crime rate of the county.

List of sheriffs

See also 

 List of law enforcement agencies in Virginia

References

External links
Loudoun County Sheriff's Office official weblink
Loudoun government official website

Government in Loudoun County, Virginia
County sheriffs' offices of Virginia
|}